Zilahy is a Hungarian surname that may refer to
Gyula Zilahy (1859–1938), Hungarian stage and film actor
Irène Zilahy (1904–1944), Hungarian actress 
Lajos Zilahy (1891–1974), Hungarian novelist and playwright 
Péter Zilahy (born 1970), Hungarian writer and performer 

Hungarian-language surnames